The Connacht Junior Club Hurling Championship is a hurling competition that comprises the winners of the senior hurling competitions from Sligo and Leitrim along with the Galway champions who receive a bye to the final. The winners of this competition qualify for the All-Ireland Junior Club Hurling Championship.

The county champions of Mayo and Roscommon compete in the intermediate grade.

The current champions are Easkey Sea Blues of Sligo who defeated Ballygar of Galway in the 2022 final.

Qualification

Recent championships
2022

List of Finals

Roll of Honour

By club

By county

See also
 Munster Junior Club Hurling Championship
 Leinster Junior Club Hurling Championship
 Ulster Junior Club Hurling Championship

References

3